"Bingo Bango" is a song written and recorded by English electronic music duo Basement Jaxx for their debut album, Remedy (1999). The track, which contains a sample of Bolivar's "Merengue" and as a result, Jose Ibata and Rolando Ibata are credited as songwriters, combined dance music with various elements of Latin music. It was released by XL Recordings as the album's fourth single on 27 March 2000, and later became the duo's third  1 song on the Billboard Dance Club Songs chart. The song also peaked at No. 6 in Iceland and No. 13 in the United Kingdom.

In other media, "Bingo Bango" appeared in television shows and films, such as the American version of Queer as Folk, The Dancer (2000), and various televised sports events. A 2012 cover version by American Hot 8 Brass Band received positive reception. In 2011, Basement Jaxx's Felix Buxton and musician Jules Buckley created an orchestral version of the song and included it in the live album Basement Jaxx vs. Metropole Orkest.

Production
"Bingo Bango" is a four-to-the-floor dance song that was primarily influenced by Latin music. It contains elements of samba, calypso, house, and techno, and was said by Barry Walters of Rolling Stone to also "layer ska on top of salsa." AllMusic's John Bush noticed the use of horn throughout the production, which Michaelangelo Matos described in The Rolling Stone Album Guide as "carnival-bound horn blasts." Bush additionally wrote that, similar to "Rendez-Vu", "Bingo Bango" was another Remedy (1999) track that shared "the NuYoricans' penchant for Latin vibes." A sample of Bolivar's "Merengue" also appeared in the song.

In 2011, Felix Buxton collaborated with musician Jules Buckley to re-arrange fifteen of Basement Jaxx's tracks for a live orchestral show. "We made it into a Viennese Waltz for the simplest reason: why the hell not?," Jules stated. Andy Gill of The Independent wrote that this new version was based around waltz-time harpsichord and "raffishly muted" trumpet.

Critical and commercial reception
Matt Hendrickson from Rolling Stone called "Bingo Bango" an "a calypso romp," whilst Alice Fisher of The Observer described it as "riotous". In a review for MetroActive, Michelle Goldberg praised the song's "brilliant melding" between the different genres. She claimed it was done with a "gleeful naturalness so that the foreign sounds never sound like superfluous spice." On the other hand, British music magazine NME was extremely negative, stating:

The orchestral rendition received a favorable review from The Independent Andy Gill, who labelled it a "delicate, sugarplum-fairy re-imagining." He further wrote: "[The re-arrangement] becomes as unashamedly widescreen as a Spielberg film score by John Williams, speeding up as it goes along like a Greek or Cossack dance – just one benefit of its being freed from sequencer rhythms."

Commercially, "Bingo Bango" achieved moderate success. On 29 July 2000, the song topped the Billboard Dance Club Songs chart and stayed there for two consecutive weeks. It was the duo's third  1 on the chart, following "Red Alert" and "Rendez-Vu", both in 1999. "Bingo Bango" later peaked at No. 7 on its year-end edition of 2000. It also peaked at No. 13 in the United Kingdom and No. 99 in Netherlands. In 2004, MTV Dance ranked the song at No. 65 in their Top 100 Ibiza Anthems list. The results were voted by various industrial disc jockeys and artists.

Promotion and other usages 

Basement Jaxx directed a music video for "Bingo Bango" and included it on their video compilation The Videos (2005). The song also appeared in their 1999 Essential Mix of the Year-winning DJ mix, broadcast on BBC Radio 1 in May, and on their greatest hits album, The Singles (2005).

On Hot 8 Brass Band's second studio album, The Life & Times Of... (2012), the band's cover of the song was highly acclaimed by AllMusic's Al Campbell. Campbell said: "In the context of brass band music, ["Bingo Bango" is not a track] that would immediately come to mind as complementing that style. But in the hands of the Hot 8, not only do they make it work, it coheres entirely throughout the disc." Neil Spencer from The Observer wrote that their cover brought the Latin "flavors" to the song.

On television, "Bingo Bango" was used in the second episode of series two of At Home with the Braithwaites, which aired on 11 January 2001. American show Queer as Folk featured the song twice during its first season. The original version appeared in "No Bris, No Shirt, No Service", which aired on 10 December 2000; while the "Latin Mix" appeared in "Full Circle", which aired on 24 June 2001. On 7 June 2005, the song appeared during the first episode of Sugar Rush.

Theatrically, French drama The Dancer (2000), American teen comedy Get Over It (2001) and the action thriller Extreme Ops (2002) all featured the track. The first two films also included it in their soundtrack albums. "Bingo Bango" was a downloadable game feature on DanceStar Digital in 2013. In 2001, both The Guardian and The Independent observed that the track frequently accompanied many televised sports events and commercials. Buxton told the latter publication: "I saw a bit of football yesterday and as usual they were playing 'Bingo Bango' alongside the commentary. I thought how much it suits it – it was very energetic. I felt very proud."

Basement Jaxx usually ended their live performances with "Bingo Bango". For their set at Creamfields festival in 2000, they brought on stage a "dazzling troupe of feathered Mardi Gras dancers" during the song. In 2011, Jules Buckley and Metropole Orkest, which consists of a 60-piece orchestra and a 20-voice choir, performed the Buxton-written orchestral version in three shows in the Netherlands and United Kingdom. Recordings of the Netherlands' concert later became the material for the duo's first live album, Basement Jaxx vs. Metropole Orkest (2011).

Formats and track listings

Australia maxi single
 "Red Alert"  – 3:36
 "Bingo Bango"  – 3:45
 "Red Alert"  – 6:21
 "Bingo Bango"  – 7:26
 "Bingo Bango"  – 7:01

Europe CD single
 "Bingo Bango"  – 3:45
 "Bingo Bango"  – 7:26

Europe and UK maxi / Italy and UK 12-inch single
 "Bingo Bango"  – 3:45
 "Bingo Bango"  – 7:01
 "Jump 'n Shout"  – 5:46

UK 12-inch single
 "Bingo Bango"  – 7:26
 "Bingo Bango"  – 6:30
 "Jump 'n Shout"  – 5:46

UK cassette single
 "Bingo Bango"  – 3:45
 "Bingo Bango"  – 7:01
 "Bingo Bango"  – 6:05

US 12-inch single
 "Bingo Bango"  – 8:30
 "Bingo Bango"  – 8:01
 "Bingo Bango"  – 7:48
 "Bingo Bango"  – 6:00
 "Bingo Bango"  – 7:36
 "Bingo Bango"  – 5:56
 "Bingo Bango"  – 3:49
 "Bingo Bango"  – 3:06

Credits
Credits adapted from the liner notes of Remedy and The Singles.

Recording and management
 Mastered by Mike Marsh at The Exchange.
 Published by Universal Music (formerly MCA Music)/Bryunny Publishing.
 Contains a sample of "Merengue" of Bolivar courtesy of Acid Jazz Records.

Personnel

 Simon Ratcliffe – writing, production
 Felix Buxton – writing, production
 Jose Ibata;– writing
 Rolando Ibata;– writing
 Ugo Delmirani – keyboards solo

 Cassie Watson – main vocal
 Jorges – word bitz
 Nyna – word bitz

Charts

Weekly charts

Year-end charts

References

1999 songs
2000 singles
Astralwerks singles
Basement Jaxx songs
Songs written by Felix Buxton
Songs written by Simon Ratcliffe (musician)
XL Recordings singles
Latin house songs